This is a list of prime ministers of Togo since the formation of the post of Prime Minister in 1960, to the present day.

A total of thirteen people have served as Prime Minister of Togo – twelve men and one woman. Among them, one person, Edem Kodjo, has served on two non-consecutive occasions.

The incumbent prime minister, Victoire Tomegah Dogbé, was appointed by president Faure Gnassingbé. She took the oath on 28 September 2020.

History of the office

1991 conflict with the presidency
In the months following the appointment of Joseph Kokou Koffigoh as Prime Minister by the National Conference on 27 August 1991, the soldiers of the Togolese Armed Forces (FAT) loyal to President Gnassingbé Eyadéma repeatedly tried to oust Koffigoh:

 On 1 October 1991, the soldiers seized the national radio and television station and demanded that Koffigoh resign before leaving the station; Koffigoh said afterwards on the radio that order was restored.
 On 8 October 1991, the soldiers unsuccessfully tried to kidnap Koffigoh, and four people were reported killed in protests and violence that followed.
 In late November 1991, the soldiers began a siege of Koffigoh's official residence in Lomé after Eyadéma's party, the Rally of the Togolese People (RPT), was banned by the transitional High Council of the Republic (HCR). They demanded that Koffigoh's government be replaced and threatening to "reduce the city to ashes"; they also demanded that the RPT be legalized again and that the HCR be dissolved. Koffigoh called for French military aid. Eyadéma publicly called on the soldiers to return to their barracks and expressed continued trust in Koffigoh, but also invited him to begin consultations on the formation of a new national unity government. After two days of talks, the soldiers lifted their siege; however, they promptly resumed it. Koffigoh then offered to include supporters of Eyadéma in the government, but he refused to dissolve his government altogether, and he again called for French aid. On 3 December 1991, the soldiers succeeded in capturing Koffigoh in a heavy assault on his official residence, involving tanks and machine guns. Many people were killed in this violence: at least 17, and possibly more than 200. The soldiers then took Koffigoh to meet with Eyadéma, who was widely believed to have been behind the soldiers' actions, although he did not take responsibility for them. Later on the same day, Eyadéma released a statement saying that he and Koffigoh would form a new transitional government. Although Koffigoh remained in office, his power was considered curtailed. On 31 December, a new government headed by Koffigoh was announced, including three members of the RPT; most members of the previous government remained in their posts.

Duties and competences
The President of the Republic appoints the Prime Minister. He terminates his functions.

The Prime Minister is the head of the Government. He directs the action of the Government and coordinates the functions of the other members. He presides over the Committees of Defense. He substitutes for, the case arising, the President of the Republic in the presidency of the Councils provided for in Articles 66 and 72 of this Constitution. He assures the interim of the head of the State in case of incapacity for cause of illness or of absence from the national territory.

Before his entry into office, the Prime Minister presents before the National Assembly the program of action of his Government.

The National Assembly accords its confidence to him by a vote with the absolute majority of its members.

The Prime Minister assures the execution of the laws.

He may delegate certain of his powers to the ministers.

The acts of the President of the Republic other than those provided for in Articles 4, 66, 68, 73, 74, 98, 100, 104 and 109 of this Constitution, are countersigned by the Prime Minister or, the case arising, by the Ministers given the charge of their execution.

List of officeholders
Key
Political parties

Other factions

See also
List of presidents of Togo
List of colonial governors of Togo
Politics of Togo

References

External links
World Statesmen – Togo
1992 Constitution of Togo (as amended in 2007)

Togo
Prime Ministers